This article describes Kapitan as military rank, not to be confused with the title of Kapitan. For the equivalent OF-2 rank in Anglophone armed forces, see Captain, and in Germany see Hauptmann.

In member countries of NATO-alliance Kapitan is a commissioned officer rank, rated OF-2 in line to the NATO officers rank system. The almost equivalent OF-2 officer, e.g. in the US Army, is the Captain rank.

Historical roots 
Kapitan (appointment, later rank) was used first in the middle age in France in order to designate leaders of the military districts or regions. In the second half of the 16th century, it came in use to specify commanding officers of company-sized units. In the 19th century it became gradually a military rank, and was used in combination with other noun, e.g. Stabs-kapitan (ru: штабс-капитан Russian Imperial Army) Kapitan-leytenant (naval forces). The rank designation Kapitan contains a common syllable and historical roots in a number of European countries at the one hand. Slight national variations of spelling are for the sake of the historical and heraldic tradition, at the other hand.

Different countries

Russia 

In Russia, the military rank Kapitan was introduced in the 16th century to foreign officers, appointed to commander of company-sized units. In the 17th – 18th century this rank became open to all company commanders, serving in the regular army. In the cavalierly (in dragoon regiments and Special Corps of Gendarmes) the equivalent to Kapitan was Rotmister (derived from the German Rittmeister), and in the Cossacks corps it was Yesaul.

In the Russian Army (1855–1917) and in the so-called White Army braid shoulder boards with one central stripe have been worn (see picture 1, below). As the Major-rank was abolished in May 1884, the Kapitan-rank was upgraded to level VIII in the rank table. However, the Guards kapitan became equivalent to generic Podpolkovnik in the Army.

In the civil administration Kapitan of the infantry was equivalent to the Council assessor (ru: коллежский асессор; kollezhsky asessor) from 1884, and Titular adviser (ru: титулярный советник, tituljarny sovetnik) until 1884.

Some examples of rank insignia (epaulette, shoulder board), used by  RIA IRA, are shown below:

Soviet Union and Russian Federation 
In the armed forces of the Soviet Union (later Russian Federation) the Kapitan´s rank (to Army, Air Force, and Navy land services) was introduced by disposal of the Central Executive Committee of the Soviet Union and the Council of People's Commissars, from September 22, 1935. It was equivalent to the rank kapitan-leytenant (ru: капитан-лейтенант) of the Navy.

If military personnel serves in a guards formation, or on a guards war ship, to the rank designation will be placed in front the noun guards (e.g. "Gurds kapitan"). Civil – or military personnel with a specific defined level of expertise or knowledge in medical or judicial professions, to the military rank will be added the noun "legal or the wording "medical service". Further adding to the military rank designation might be "retired" or "on retirement".

Personnel serving in the executive of the Russian Federation might be specified by rank designation as follows.

Kapitan of the Police (until March 1, 2011 Kapitan of the Militsiya)
Kapitan of the Internal Troops
Kapitan investigation of tax offence

Rank insignia
Some examples of rank insignia (shoulder, collar, and sleeve), used by Russia and the USSR, are shown below:

Kapitan ranks by country

Army ranks

References 
 

Military ranks